James Reynolds McAllister (born 26 April 1978 in Glasgow) is a Scottish professional football coach and former player, who is currently an assistant manager at Hibernian. McAllister played as a defender. McAllister played for Queen of the South, Aberdeen, Livingston, Heart of Midlothian, Bristol City, Preston North End, Yeovil Town, Kerala Blasters and Exeter City. He made one full international appearance for Scotland, in 2004. Since retiring as a player he has been an assistant coach at Bristol City, Sunderland and Hibernian.

Club career

Early career 
McAllister signed an "S" form with Motherwell Boys Club, before being released from his contract by then Motherwell manager Alex McLeish. McAllister then joined Bellshill Boys Club where he played alongside David Lilley.

Queen of the South 
McAllister began his senior career in 1996 by signing for Dumfries club Queen of the South with new chairman Norman Blount getting the wheels moving on the club's revival. At Palmerston Park McAllister and Lilley became teammates again.

In 1997 the club reached the Scottish Challenge Cup final for the first time. Second division Queen of the South lost 1–0 to First division Falkirk despite a rousing Queens display at Motherwell's Fir Park Stadium; a performance that included the man of the match award going to Queens veteran central midfield playmaker Tommy Bryce and an early career appearance for McAllister as substitute. A late chance for a Derek Townsley equaliser went agonisingly over for Queens.

McAllister became one of the most sought after players in the lower leagues and was courted by several Scottish Premier League clubs before leaving at the end of the season in 1999.

Aberdeen 
Ebbe Skovdahl signed him for Aberdeen for a fee of £85,000 with further add ons as he made more appearances, resulting in a final fee of over £100,000.  Lilley became his teammate at the third successive club. He scored once during his spell in Aberdeen, his strike coming in a 2–0 Scottish Cup win over his future club Livingston on 26 January 2002.

Livingston 
In June 2003 Livingston signed McAllister on a free transfer after competition from English clubs. It was in this spell at the West Lothian club that he regained his form and won a deserved call up from Berti Vogts for the International friendly match against Trinidad and Tobago. It was also during his spell at Livingston that he won the Scottish League Cup after a 2–0 victory over Hibernian in which he scored the second goal in the final. His only other goal for Livingston came in a 3–1 league win against Motherwell on 14 February 2004.

Heart of Midlothian 
At the end of the 2003–04 season McAllister's contract expired and he agreed a two-year deal to sign for Heart of Midlothian. During his spell at Tynecastle he was mainly used as a squad player, due to the outstanding form of Takis Fyssas and the signing of Jose Goncalves.

In January 2006, McAllister agreed a two-year contract extension; however he was soon dissatisfied with his peripheral status at the club, particularly after the appointment of Valdas Ivanauskas as Hearts manager in April. McAllister scored twice during his spell at Hearts with both goals coming in the Scottish Cup. His first came in the 2004–05 season against former club Livingston, and his second came the following season against Kilmarnock.

Bristol City 

On 2 August 2006 McAllister signed for Bristol City on a two-year contract. In his first season at the Ashton Gate stadium he helped the club gain promotion to the Championship.

In his second season McAllister was a mainstay of the team that made it to the final of the Championship play-offs. On 24 May 2008 Hull City defeated Bristol City 1–0 to reach the English Premier League with a goal from Dean Windass after 38 minutes.

On 10 March 2009 he scored his first goal in over a year with a curling effort from the edge of the box against Coventry City.

On 2 October 2008 McAllister was recalled to the Scotland squad by manager George Burley for the FIFA World Cup qualifier against Norway.

Yeovil Town 
Having been released by Bristol City at the end of the 2011–12 season, McAllister signed for Football League One side Yeovil Town on a two-year contract linking up with former manager Gary Johnson. McAllister captained his Yeovil side to victory in the 2013 League One play-off final and promotion to the Football League Championship for the first time in the club's history.

McAllister made a further 40 appearances in the 2013–14 season for Yeovil but could not prevent them from suffering relegation from the Championship, and was released at the end of the campaign.

Kerala Blasters 
Following his release by Yeovil, McAllister joined Indian Super League side Kerala Blasters as a player/coach.

Exeter City 
On 16 January 2015, McAllister returned to English football signing for League Two side Exeter City.

International career 
McAllister made his Scotland debut, on 30 May 2004, in a 4–1 friendly victory against Trinidad and Tobago at Easter Road.

On 2 October 2008, McAllister was recalled to the Scotland squad by manager George Burley for the FIFA World Cup qualifier against Norway. On 17 March 2009, McAllister was called up to the Scotland squad for their World Cup qualifying double-header against the Netherlands and Iceland.

Coaching career
On 1 July 2016, McAllister announced his retirement from playing professional football to take up the role of under-21 manager at Bristol City. He then became assistant manager to Lee Johnson at Bristol City. On 30 December 2020 he was appointed assistant head coach at Sunderland, again working with Johnson. With the sacking of Johnson on 30 January 2022, McAllister also left his role at Sunderland. He again teamed up with Johnson at Hibernian, becoming their assistant manager in June 2022.

Career statistics

Club

International

References

External links

 
 
 

1978 births
Footballers from Glasgow
Living people
Association football defenders
Scottish footballers
Scotland B international footballers
Scotland international footballers
Scottish Football League players
Scottish Premier League players
English Football League players
Kerala Blasters FC players
Queen of the South F.C. players
Aberdeen F.C. players
Livingston F.C. players
Heart of Midlothian F.C. players
Bristol City F.C. players
Preston North End F.C. players
Yeovil Town F.C. players
Exeter City F.C. players
Expatriate footballers in India
Indian Super League players
Kerala Blasters FC non-playing staff
Bristol City F.C. non-playing staff
Sunderland A.F.C. non-playing staff
Hibernian F.C. non-playing staff